Gyrtona malgassica is a moth of the family Noctuidae first described by George Hamilton Kenrick in 1917. It is found on Madagascar.

This moth is greyish brown and the adults have a wingspan of 28 mm.

References

Stictopterinae
Moths of Madagascar
Moths of Africa
Moths described in 1917